The arithmetic rope, or knotted rope, was a widely used arithmetic tool in the Middle Ages that could be used to solve many mathematical and geometrical problems.

An arithmetic rope generally has at least 13 knots—therefore, it is often called thirteen-knot-rope—placed at equal intervals. More knots were beneficial, especially for multiplication and division.

In medieval architecture, the knotted rope was indispensable for architects, because it allowed the construction of equilateral and right-angled triangles, as well as circles.

In the depiction of the liberal arts in Hortus deliciarum, the allegory of arithmetics is a female figure with a knotted rope.

Arithmetic functions

Notes

External links
 ZDF Mediathek - Video showing the application of the arithmetic rope (in German)
 http://turba-delirantium.skyrocket.de/wissenschaft/rechenseil.htm (in German)

Mathematical tools
Arithmetic